Albert Cooper (April 12, 1924 – January 25, 2011) was a British flute maker who apprenticed at Rudall Carte until World War II. After discharge, he returned to Rudall Carte but left in 1959 and set himself up as flute maker.

Flutes manufactured
C flutes - 80 
Alto flutes - 8
Piccolos with C foot - 2 
Bass flute - 3
Flute in B - 1
Cooper's primary contribution to flute making is the Cooper Scale, where the position and size (opening) of the flute's tone holes have been accurately determined. This has been now universally adopted and is promoted by all the major flute makers, in particular the flute maker Brannen Brothers. This new scale replaces the old Boehm system scale and measurements still being used in flute manufacture into the 1990s.

Notes

References 
Interview with Alexander Eppler
 Albert Cooper Flute Competition that ran from 1990 to 2007. Original site http://www.stratford-flute.co.uk/albert.htm is defunct but there's an archive at https://web.archive.org/web/20050901081533/http://www.stratford-flute.co.uk/albert.htm

External links
 http://www.fluteworx.co.za/articles/ACooper0209.pdf

Flute makers
1924 births
2011 deaths
British musical instrument makers